Kanesuke is a masculine Japanese given name. Notable people with the name include:

 Kanesuke Hara (原 摂祐, 1885–1962), Japanese botanist
 Fujiwara no Kanesuke (藤原 兼輔, 877–933), Japanese middle Heian waka poet
 Takatsukasa Kanesuke(鷹司 兼輔, 1480–1552), Japanese court noble of the late Muromachi period

Japanese masculine given names